Lloyd Lyne Dines (29 March 1885, in Shelbyville, Missouri – 17 January 1964, in Quincy, Illinois) was an American-Canadian mathematician, known for his pioneering work on linear inequalities.

Education and career
Dines received B.A. in 1906 and M.A. in 1907 from Northwestern University and Ph.D. in 1911 from the University of Chicago under Gilbert Bliss with thesis The highest common factor of a system of polynomials in one variable, with an application to implicit functions. In 1911 he became an instructor of mathematics at Columbia University and then became an associate professor at the University of Arizona. From 1915 to 1934 he was a professor at the University of Saskatchewan. In 1928 he was elected to the Royal Society of Canada. In 1932 he was an invited speaker at the International Congress of Mathematicians in Zürich. From 1934 to 1945 he was a professor at the Carnegie Institute of Technology and chair of the mathematics department. After his retirement in 1945, Dines held visiting professorships at the University of Saskatchewan, Smith College, and Northwestern University.

Selected publications

with David Moskovitz:

References

1885 births
1964 deaths
20th-century American mathematicians
Canadian mathematicians
Northwestern University alumni
University of Chicago alumni
Academic staff of the University of Saskatchewan
Carnegie Mellon University faculty
People from Shelbyville, Missouri
Fellows of the Royal Society of Canada